Udurawana is a village in Pathadumbara Divisional Secretariat, within Kandy District, within Central Province in Sri Lanka. Nearest town is Wattegama.

Notable People 
Heen Banda Udurawana, the 16th Diyawadana Nilame of the Temple of the Sacred Tooth Relic.

See also
List of towns in Central Province, Sri Lanka

External links

Populated places in Kandy District